Senghasiella is a genus of flowering plants in the orchid family, Orchidaceae. It contains only one known species, Senghasiella glaucifolia, endemic to southwestern China (Gansu, Guizhou, Shaanxi, Sichuan, Tibet, Yunnan).

See also
 List of Orchidaceae genera

References

External links
IOSPE orchid photos, Habenaria glaucifolia Bureau & Franch. 1891 Photo by © The Societe des Amateurs Jardins Alpins website
Life Desks Plants of Tibet, Habenaria glaucifolia Bureau & Franchet
eFloras, Photos by The Biodiversity of the Hengduan Mountains Project, Habenaria glaucifolia

Monotypic Orchidoideae genera
Orchideae genera
Orchids of China
Orchideae